The following outlines the current political situation of Gdańsk. See also Administrations of Danzig 1342–1945.

Members of European Parliament (MEPs) from Gdańsk
 Janusz Lewandowski, PO — economist, leader of Gdańsk liberals, former minister of privatization
 Anna Fotyga, PiS — economist, Solidarity adviser, former vice-president (mayor) of Gdańsk

Members of Polish Parliament (MPs) from Gdańsk

Members of Parliament (Sejm) elected from Gdańsk constituency

 Jolanta Banach, SLD-UP  
 Tadeusz Cymański, PiS 
 Danuta Hojarska, Samoobrona  
 Lech Kaczyński, PiS 
 Janusz Lewandowski, PO -> 2004 MEP 
 Andrzej Liss, PiS
 Jerzy Młynarczyk, SLD-UP
 Małgorzata Ostrowska, SLD-UP
 Grażyna Paturalska, PO 
 Maciej Płażyński, PO
 Franciszek Potulski, SLD-UP  
 Edmund Stachowicz, SLD-UP 
 Gertruda Szumska, LPR

Municipal politics

Mayors 
 Aleksandra Dulkiewicz (2019-)
 Paweł Adamowicz, Civic Platform (1998—2019)
 Tomasz Posadzki, Democratic Union — Samorządność coalition (1994–1998)
 Franciszek Jamroż (1991–1994) imprisoned in 2004 on charges of bribery and corruption
 Jacek Starościak (1990–1991)
 Jerzy Pasiński, Polish United Workers' Party (1989–1990)

Gdańsk
Politics of Poland